Ellopium or Ellopion was a town in ancient Aetolia.

References

Populated places in ancient Aetolia
Former populated places in Greece
Lost ancient cities and towns